The preliminary stages of the 2011 Copa Bridgestone Sudamericana de Clubes consisted of two stages:
First Stage (first legs: August 2–4, 9, 18; second legs: August 11, 16–18, 23, 25)
Second Stage, divided into three sections:
Argentina (first legs: August 30 – September 1; second legs: September 6–8)
Brazil (first legs: August 10–11; second legs: August 23–25)
Rest of South America (first legs: August 30, September 1, 8, 13, 15; second legs: September 14, 20–22)

Format
The draw was made in Buenos Aires on June 28, 2011. Sixteen teams (all from rest of South America) competed in the First Stage, where they were drawn into eight ties. The eight winners of the First Stage joined another twenty-two teams (six from Argentina, eight from Brazil, eight from rest of South America) to compete in the Second Stage, where they were drawn into fifteen ties.

Teams played in two-legged ties on a home-away basis. Each team earned 3 points for a win, 1 point for a draw, and 0 points for a loss. The following criteria were used for breaking ties on points:
Goal difference
Away goals
Penalty shootout (no extra time is played)
The fifteen winners of the Second Stage advanced to the round of 16 to join the defending champion Independiente.

First stage
Team 1 played the second leg at home.

|-

|-

|-

|-

|-

|-

|-

|-

|}

Match A

Nacional won on points 4–1.

Match B

Santa Fe won on points 4–1.

Match C

Universidad de Chile won on points 4–1.

Match D

Tied on points 3–3, Deportivo Anzoátegui won on goal difference.

Match E

Tied on points 3–3, Olimpia won on goal difference.

Match F

La Equidad won on points 6–0.

Match G

Universidad Católica won on points 4–1.

Match H

LDU Quito won on points 4–1.

Second stage
Team 1 played the second leg at home.

|-

|}

Match O1

Vélez Sársfield won on points 4–1.

Match O2

Note: The second leg was suspended at the start of the second half by the referee after a projectile hit a linesman.
Universidad de Chile won on points 6–0.

Match O3

Tied on points 3–3, Vasco da Gama won on away goals.

Match O4

Libertad won on points 6–0.

Match O6

Universitario won on points 6–0.

Match O7

Tied on points 3–3, Arsenal won on goal difference.

Match O8

Tied on points 2–2, Santa Fe won on penalties.

Match O9

Botafogo won on points 6–0.

Match O10

Note: The second leg was abandoned after 81 minutes by the referee due to objects thrown onto the field.
Olimpia won on points 6–0.

Match O11

Tied on points 2–2, Godoy Cruz won on away goals.

Match O12

LDU Quito won on points 6–0.

Match O13

Tied on points 3–3, São Paulo won on goal difference.

Match O14

Aurora won on points 4–1.

Match O15

Flamengo won on points 6–0.

Match O16

Universidad Católica won on points 4–1.

References

External links
Official webpage 

Preliminary Stages